Manantiales is a resort (balneario) in the Maldonado Department of southeastern Uruguay.

In the Spanish language in the Americas, a manantial means spring.

Geography
The resort is located on the coast of the Atlantic Ocean, on Route 10, between its junction with Route 104 to the east and Laguna Blanca (which means White Lagoon) to the west. On its coastline is a small point called Punta Piedras. To the west of this point is the beach Las Olas Playa and to its east the beach Playa Bikini. To the west, it borders a neighbourhood called "Barrio San Carlos", which lies just east of the resort La Barra, and to the east it borders the resort El Chorro.

Population
In 2011 Manantiales had a population of 149 permanent inhabitants and 486 dwellings.
 
Source: Instituto Nacional de Estadística de Uruguay

References

External links
Article on Manantiales, Official Portal of the Uruguayan Government
INE map of El Tesoro, La Barra, Laguna Blanca, Manantiales and El Chorro

Populated places in the Maldonado Department
Seaside resorts in Uruguay